The 2004–05 National Division Three South was the fifth season (18th overall) of the fourth division (south) of the English domestic rugby union competition using the name National Division Three South.  New teams to the division included Lydney who were relegated from 2003–04 National Division Two as well as Havant (champions) and Hertford (playoffs) who were promoted from London Division 1 while Reading came up as champions of South West Division 1.  The season would also see the introduction of a new points system with 4 points being awarded for a win, 2 points being awarded for a draw (replacing the old system of 2 points for a win and 1 for a draw) with the addition of a bonus point being given for scoring 4 or more tries as well as a bonus point given if you manage to lose a game within 7 points of the victorious team.  In terms of promotion the league champions would go straight up into National Division Two while the runners up would have a one game playoff against the runners up from National Division Three North (at the home ground of the club with the superior league record) for the final promotion place. 

At the end of the season Barking finished as champions with a fantastic record of 24 wins out of 26 games, finishing 12 points ahead of runners up Redruth, with the Cornish side perhaps having finished champions in a different season with just 3 defeats.  Redruth would join Barking in the 2005–06 National Division Two by defeating the 2004–05 National Division Three North  runners up Macclesfield in the north-south playoff in front of a huge crowd of 4,000 fans at the Recreation Ground in Redruth.  At the other end of the table Haywards Heath and Tabard were the first teams to be relegated.  Weston-super-Mare were more competitive but still went down in the final relegation place, 7 points off 11th placed Old Patesians.  Haywards Heath and Tabard would drop down to London Division 1 while Weston-super-Mare went into South West Division 1.

Participating teams and locations

Final league table

Results

Round 1

Round 2

Round 3

Round 4

Round 5

Round 6

Round 7 

Postponed.  Game rescheduled to 12 February 2005.

Round 8

Round 9

Round 10

Round 11

Round 12

Round 13

Round 14

Round 15

Round 16

Round 17

Round 18

Round 7 (rescheduled game)

Game rescheduled from 6 November 2004.

Round 19

Round 20

Round 21 

Game rescheduled for 26 March 2005.

Round 22

Round 23

Round 21 (rescheduled game) 

Game rescheduled from 5 March 2005.

Round 24

Round 25

Round 26

Promotion play-off
The league runners up of National Division Three South and North would meet in a playoff game for promotion to National Division Two.  Redruth were the southern division runners up and as they had a superior league record than northern runners-up, Macclesfield, they hosted the play-off match.

Total season attendances 

Does not include promotion playoff game.

Individual statistics 

 Note that points scorers includes tries as well as conversions, penalties and drop goals.

Top points scorers

Top try scorers

Season records

Team
Largest home win — 70 pts 
70 - 0 Barking at home to Haywards Heath on 19 March 2005
Largest away win — 62 pts
77 - 15 Lydney away to Haywards Heath on 12 March 2005
Most points scored — 77 pts 
77 - 15 Lydney away to Haywards Heath on 12 March 2005
Most tries in a match — 12
Lydney at home to Weston-super-Mare on 19 March 2005
Most conversions in a match — 11
Lydney away to Haywards Heath on 12 March 2005
Most penalties in a match — 5 (x5)
Barking at home to Havant on 4 September 2004
Havant away to Tabard on 30 October 2004
Redruth at home to Tabard on 6 November 2004
Hertford at home to Southend on 22 January 2005
Haywards Heath away to Havant on 29 January 2005
Most drop goals in a match — 1
N/A - multiple teams

Player
Most points in a match — 45
 Adam Westall for Lydney away to Haywards Heath on 12 March 2005
Most tries in a match — 4 (x4)
 Tom Johnson for Reading at home to Dings Crusaders on 29 January 2005
 Adam Westall for Lydney away to Haywards Heath on 12 March 2005
 Lloyd Williams for Barking at home to Haywards Heath on 19 March 2005
 Tom Johnson for Reading at home to Lydney on 23 April 2005
Most conversions in a match — 11
 Adam Westall for Lydney away to Haywards Heath on 12 March 2005
Most penalties in a match — 5 (x2)
 Ben Montgomery for Barking at home to Havant on 4 September 2004
 Sid Claffey for Havant away to Tabard on 30 October 2004
 Bede Brown for Redruth at home to Tabard on 6 November 2004
 Neil Barrela for Hertford at home to Southend on 22 January 2005
 Owen Ashton for Haywards Heath away to Havant on 29 January 2005
Most drop goals in a match — 1
N/A - multiple players

Attendances
Highest — 1,500 (x2) 
Redruth at home to North Walsham on 5 March 2005 & Barking on 12 March 2005
Lowest — 100 (x3)
Reading at home to Tabard on 20 November 2004, Westcombe Park on 12 March 2005 and Hertford on 2 April 2005
Highest Average Attendance — 901
Redruth
Lowest Average Attendance — 154
Southend

See also
 English rugby union system
 Rugby union in England

References

External links
 NCA Rugby

2004–05
2004–05 in English rugby union leagues